François Étienne Victor de Clinchamp (20 October 1787 in Toulon - 22 September 1880 in Paris) was a French painter and author.

Biography
He was the son of Charles François René de Clinchamp, student of the Royal Military School, infantry captain, and of Claire Victoire Fortunée Bonnefoi. His family, one of the oldest in Normandy, had settled in Toulon. He married Alexandrine Françoise Crette de Palluel in Paris on August 21, 1820.

He was destined to a naval career, but his health failing he went to Paris, where he studied painting under Le Barbier and Peyron then with Girodet.

Nevertheless, he was called to direct the Toulon School of drawing of the Navy. He painted a considerable number of religious paintings for several churches in the South of France: Christ healing the Sick of the Palsy, The Sons of Zebedee, The Death of Phocion, The Baptism of Saint-Mandrier and a Crucifixion, which was his best exhibited work.

He has contributed to several newspapers, including the Ami du Bien of Marseille. He wrote some works on perspective, and several dramatic pieces. Around 1820 he invented a device named noctograph to allow blind people to read.

He took part in the Paris Salon in 1840 and 1841.

Works
 Éléments de perspective linéaire et aérienne (Paris,1820)
 Nouveau traité de la perspective des ombres et de la théorie des reflets (Toulon, 1825)
 Recueil de Fables nouvelles (Toulon, 1829)
 Cours complet de perspective linéaire et aérienne (1840)
 
 A collection of small society plays and dramas, Rodolphe de Vart, Christine à Fontainebleau, etc.

Honours
 Knight of the French Legion of Honour.

Legacy
 A street is named after him in Toulon.

References

19th-century French painters
19th-century French writers
1787 births
1880 deaths
Writers from Toulon
Artists from Toulon